Erickavu N Sunil, aka Sunil Narayana, is an 'A Grade' Indian percussion artist in mridangam at All India Radio and author of the book "Resounding Mridangam".

Early life and background 
He started learning the mridangam at the age of four. His initial teachers were Krishnappa Bhagavathar and M.S. Raju. He had his advanced studies in mridangam from Mavelikkara Velukkutty Nair.

Musical career 

An A-grade artist of All India Radio and Doordarshan, Sunil has performed alongside Padmabhushan Sangeetha Kalanidhi T. V. Sankaranarayanan, Padmasri Neyyattinkara Vasudevan, Padmasri Parassala Ponnammal, Madhurai G.S. Mony, Mavelikkara Prabhakara Varma, K. Omanakutty, K. Venktaramanan, S. Sowmya, Kunnakkudi Balamuralikrishna, Sreevalsan J. Menon, Sankaran Namboothiri, Thiruvengadu Jayaraman, Sharreth, M. Jayachandran, and Balabhaskar. Sunil teaches Mridangam online and has students in Germany, the US, the UK, Italy and the Middle East.

Indeevaram Cultural Trust 
Indeevaram is a Trivandrum-based cultural trust founded by Sunil in 2018.

Resounding Mridangam 
'Resounding Mridangam: The Majestic South-Indian Drum' was formally released in India on 18 April 2021 by K. S. Chithra. The book is part of the syllabus for music students at various universities across the globe.

References

External links 
 Erickavu N Sunil – YouTube Channel
 Erickavu N Sunil – Facebook Page

Living people
Mridangam players
Indian drummers
21st-century drummers
21st-century male musicians
Indian male classical musicians
Musicians from Kerala
People from Alappuzha district
20th-century drummers
20th-century Indian male singers
20th-century Indian singers
1977 births